The Depths: The Evolutionary Origins of the Depression Epidemic is a 2014 book authored by Jonathan Rottenberg about major depressive disorder.

References

2014 non-fiction books
Books about depression
Basic Books books